Garhi Usmani Khel is an administrative unit, known as Union council, of Malakand District in the Khyber Pakhtunkhwa province of Pakistan.

See also 
Malakand District

External links

Khyber-Pakhtunkhwa Government website section on Lower Dir

Malakand District
Populated places in Malakand District
Union councils of Khyber Pakhtunkhwa
Union Councils of Malakand District